Megalobrimus scutellatus is a species of beetle in the family Cerambycidae. It was described by Per Olof Christopher Aurivillius in 1916. It is known from Tanzania and Malawi.

References

Phrissomini
Beetles described in 1916